Cheick Omar Diabate is a Nigerien football manager.

Niger

Taking over from Gernot Rohr as Niger coach in 2014, Diabate guided the Menas to a 3-1 defeat to Cape Verde and a 1-1 draw with Mozambique, ultimately failing to qualify for the 2015 Africa Cup of Nations. 

Beforehand, he was the assistant coach of the national team but was given the task of finishing the qualifying campaign following Rohr's departure. He has also expostulated with the Togolese Football Federation's decision to suspend the domestic league and has adjured them to resume it.

References

External links
 
 

Year of birth missing (living people)
Living people
Nigerien football managers
Niger national football team managers